Luis Acuña (born January 20, 1989 in Merlo, Buenos Aires, Argentina) is an Argentine footballer currently playing for Club Deportivo Aguila of El Salvador. Besides Argentina, he has played in Chile, Mexico, El Salvador, Guatemala, and Nicaragua.

Teams
  Vélez Sársfield 2009-2010
  Sarmiento de Junín 2010
  Deportes Puerto Montt 2011
  Everton 2012
  San Marcos de Arica 2013
  A.C. Barnechea 2013-2014
  Venados F.C. 2014–2017
  Real Esteli 2019–present

References

1989 births
Living people
Argentine expatriate footballers
Argentine footballers
Club Atlético Sarmiento footballers
Club Atlético Vélez Sarsfield footballers
Puerto Montt footballers
Everton de Viña del Mar footballers
Primera B de Chile players
Expatriate footballers in Chile
Expatriate footballers in Mexico
Association football midfielders
Footballers from Buenos Aires